David Mateos Rocha (born 7 February 1985) is a Spanish footballer who plays for Mérida AD as a central midfielder.

Club career
Born in Cáceres, Extremadura, Rocha started playing football in CP Cacereño's youth system, and made his debuts as a senior in the 2002–03 campaign, in Segunda División B. In 2005, he moved to Villarreal CF B in Tercera División, appearing regularly for the side.

On 11 January 2008 Rocha joined FC Cartagena in the third level. On 15 July he returned to Cacereño, with the side now in the fourth division, winning promotion in his first season.

On 14 July 2011 Rocha signed for Albacete Balompié, after being team captain at his previous club. On 26 June 2013 he moved to fellow third division side Gimnàstic de Tarragona, signing a two-year deal.

On 19 June 2015, after winning promotion to Segunda División with Nàstic, Rocha renewed his link until 2018. He made his professional debut on 23 August, starting in a 2–2 home draw against former club Albacete.

On 21 January 2016 Rocha moved abroad for the first time in his career, after agreeing to a three-year deal with Major League Soccer side Houston Dynamo.  On 6 July 2016, he mutually terminated his contract with Dynamo after alleging "family reasons".

On 11 July 2016 Rocha returned to Spain and its second tier, after agreeing to a two-year deal with Real Oviedo. On 4 July 2018 he terminated his contract, and returned to Gimnàstic just hours later.

Rocha cut ties with Nàstic on 24 January 2019, and signed a short-term deal with fellow league team UD Almería just hours later. On 2 July, he signed a two-year contract with Extremadura UD, still in the second division.

References

External links

1985 births
Living people
People from Cáceres, Spain
Sportspeople from the Province of Cáceres
Spanish footballers
Footballers from Extremadura
Association football midfielders
Segunda División players
Segunda División B players
Tercera División players
CP Cacereño players
Villarreal CF B players
FC Cartagena footballers
Albacete Balompié players
Gimnàstic de Tarragona footballers
Real Oviedo players
UD Almería players
Extremadura UD footballers
Mérida AD players
Major League Soccer players
Houston Dynamo FC players
Spanish expatriate footballers
Spanish expatriate sportspeople in the United States
Expatriate soccer players in the United States